Kamenica (Каменица) is a village in Serbia. It is situated in the Koceljeva municipality, in the Mačva District of Central Serbia. The village had a Serb ethnic majority and a population of 941 in 2002.

Historical population

1948: 1,344
1953: 1,360
1961: 1,298
1971: 1,239
1981: 1,102
1991: 888
2002: 696

See also
List of places in Serbia

References

External links

Populated places in Mačva District